Catthorpe is a village and civil parish in the Harborough district of Leicestershire, England. At the 2001 Census, the parish had a population of 179, falling slightly to 173 at the 2011 census, further decreasing to 156 at the 2021 census.

The name 'Catthorpe' is made up of 'thorpe' meaning 'outlying farm/settlement' and 'Cat'. 'Cat' was probably added after Isabel le Cat and Simon Mallore donated the land to Leicester Abbey.

Catthorpe gives its name to the nearby Catthorpe Interchange road junction formed by the M1 and M6 motorways and the A14 road, which was known to be regularly congested owing to its non-standard design. The A14 passed under both motorways; these underpasses were built in the 1960s for the former A427, which passed through Catthorpe. Between 2014 and 2016 the interchange was the subject of a major redesign to reduce the congestion and improve safety by providing free-flowing links and removing direct access from the local road network.

Between 1850 and 1966 Catthorpe was served by the nearby Lilbourne railway station on the now dismantled Rugby to Peterborough Line

Catthorpe briefly came to national attention in 1999 when the Latvian alleged war criminal Konrāds Kalējs was revealed to be living at Catthorpe Manor, a nursing home near the village.

The parish church, dedicated to St Thomas, dates from the 14th century and is Grade II* listed, but is currently on Historic England's Heritage at Risk Register as being in a 'vary bad' state due to masonry defects and heritage crime. There is a village pub called the Cherry Tree and farm shop and restaurant, both are located on Main Street.

References

External links

 Information on the M1/M6/A14 junction at Catthorpe
 Local site
 Leicestershire villages

Villages in Leicestershire
Civil parishes in Harborough District